Ocean Acres is an unincorporated community and census-designated place (CDP) split between Barnegat Township and Stafford Township, in Ocean County, New Jersey, United States. As of the 2010 United States Census, the CDP's population was 16,142, of which 925 were in Barnegat Township and 15,217 were in Stafford Township.

History
Ocean Acres was started in the early 1960s, on a large tract west of the Garden State Parkway sprawling between Stafford Township and Barnegat Townships. Potential buyers were bused to the site and in its first year, 2,000 lots were sold. The original Ocean Acres development offered three home designs, two ranch styles and a bi-level design. The original models were located on New Jersey Route 72, west of the present site of the Southern Ocean Medical Center, all three are currently used as businesses.

Throughout the 1970s and 1980s, growth on the community was slow. Only a handful of the streets were paved, and most homes were used as summer homes. The community offered several recreation centers, such as a lakefront park near the Nautilus Drive entrance (it was eventually leveled to make way for an expanded lake), a second lakefront park with tennis and basketball courts off of Forecastle and Canal Drive which doesn't exist anymore, a bathing beach and pool, and an 18-hole golf course. The pool has since been removed, but the bathing beach is still open to swimmers after being closed for several years throughout the 1990s. While many original recreational centers original to Ocean Acres, many new parks and recreation centers owned by Stafford Township were built since the 1990s.

For years, a state-mandated moratorium on construction west of the Garden State Parkway had limited the 5,500-lot community to fewer than 800 homes. In the 1990s, when the moratorium was lifted and sewer lines were installed; development skyrocketed. Several area developers built nearly thousands of homes in the 1990s. Large areas of vacant land in Ocean Acres were even set aside for other individual subdivisions, such as The Oaks at Stafford development. The Ocean Acres Elementary School opened to grades K-2 in 1999.

Development in the Barnegat side of the development was restricted for years due to environmental concerns, development was jump-started in the 2000s starting with the completion of Nautilus Boulevard, which was formerly a "missing link". The Walters Group became the first developer to build in the Barnegat section, an early sales promotion for the Ocean Acres Barnegat homes included a free Toyota Yaris hatchback to be included with the homes.

In 2010, the Garden State Parkway exit 67 in Barnegat was redesigned to redirect the southbound exit ramp onto the Lighthouse Drive entrance to Ocean Acres. The opening of the exit and redesign of the interchange fueled growth of the Barnegat section starting in the 2010s, with the opening of a CVS Pharmacy and Wawa, as well as a major shopping center under construction at the intersection.

Geography
According to the United States Census Bureau, the CDP had a total area of 5.956 square miles (15.427 km2), including 5.848 square miles (15.147 km2) of land and 0.108 square miles (0.280 km2) of water (1.81%).

Demographics

Census 2010

Census 2000
As of the 2000 United States Census there were 13,155 people, 4,683 households, and 3,807 families living in the CDP. The population density was 868.2/km2 (2,248.0/mi2). There were 4,959 housing units at an average density of 327.3/km2 (847.4/mi2). The racial makeup of the CDP was 96.34% White, 1.00% African American, 0.13% Native American, 0.93% Asian, 0.02% Pacific Islander, 0.54% from other races, and 1.04% from two or more races. Hispanic or Latino of any race were 2.77% of the population.

There were 4,683 households, out of which 38.7% had children under the age of 18 living with them, 69.4% were married couples living together, 8.9% had a female householder with no husband present, and 18.7% were non-families. 15.5% of all households were made up of individuals, and 8.5% had someone living alone who was 65 years of age or older. The average household size was 2.81 and the average family size was 3.12.

In the CDP the population was spread out, with 27.3% under the age of 18, 5.9% from 18 to 24, 30.8% from 25 to 44, 20.0% from 45 to 64, and 16.0% who were 65 years of age or older. The median age was 37 years. For every 100 females, there were 96.0 males. For every 100 females age 18 and over, there were 90.8 males.

The median income for a household in the CDP was $53,169, and the median income for a family was $58,404. Males had a median income of $42,368 versus $31,208 for females. The per capita income for the CDP was $21,249. About 2.4% of families and 3.5% of the population were below the poverty line, including 4.3% of those under age 18 and 4.1% of those age 65 or over.

References

External links
 New Jersey Pinelands Commission
 New Jersey Pinelands Commission News Release (PDF)
 Ocean Acres Country Club

Census-designated places in Ocean County, New Jersey
Populated places in the Pine Barrens (New Jersey)
Barnegat Township, New Jersey
Stafford Township, New Jersey